Civic Act-up is a small pro-democracy political group in Hong Kong. It was founded on 24 September 2003 by a group of relatively young activists with the encouragement of Legislative Councillor Cyd Ho, to challenge the existing pro-government district councillors in Wanchai District in the 2003 District Council elections. There is no formal structure in the group.

Beliefs
The platform of the group includes pressing for universal suffrage for the Chief Executive and Legislative Council, improvements in urban design and transportation, paying special attention to youth, women and ethnic minority issues, and extending anti-discrimination laws to the areas of age, sexual orientation and race.

History
It was formed in the background of the 2003 July 1 march, where half of a million Hong Kong people showed up in the demonstration against the legislation of the Hong Kong Basic Law Article 23 and the Tung Chee-hwa administration. In the wake of the massive civil movement, Legislative Councillor Cyd Ho So-lan formed the Civic Act-up to contest in the Wanchai District in the 2003 District Council elections. Three out of five candidates of the group won in the 2003 District Council elections, with Cyd Ho defeated the pro-Beijing DAB's Legislative Councillor Ip Kwok-him in the Kwun Lung constituency in Central and Western District.

In 2004 LegCo elections, Cyd Ho, representing the Civic Act-up, lost her seat to DAB's Choy So-yuk with a narrow margin in Hong Kong Island due to tactical mistake of the ally Democratic Party. Cyd Ho revenged her defeat in the 2012 LegCo elections by winning in Hong Kong Island.

In 2012, Cyd Ho joined the Labour Party and ran under the Labour banner in the 2012 LegCo elections.

Electoral performance

Legislative Council elections

District Council elections

References

2003 establishments in Hong Kong
Liberal parties in Hong Kong
Political parties in Hong Kong
Political parties established in 2003